Slavery in Sudan began in ancient times, and recently had a resurgence during the Second Sudanese Civil War (1983–2005). During the Trans-Saharan slave trade, many Nilotic peoples from the lower Nile Valley were purchased as slaves and brought to work elsewhere in North Africa and the Orient by Nubians, Egyptians, Berbers and Arabs.

Starting in 1995, many human rights organizations have reported on contemporary practice, especially in the context of the Second Sudanese civil war. According to reports of Human Rights Watch and others, during the war the government of Sudan was involved in backing and arming numerous slave-taking militias in the country as part of its war against the Sudan People's Liberation Army (SPLA). It also found the government failed to enforce Sudanese laws against kidnapping, assault and forced labor, or to help victims' families locate their children.

Another report (by the International Eminent Persons Group) found both the government-backed militias and the rebels (led by the SPLA) guilty of abducting civilians, though the abducting civilians by pro-government militias was "of particular concern" and  "in a significant number of cases", led to slavery "under the definition of slavery in the International Slavery Convention of 1926". The Sudanese government maintained that the slavery is the product of inter-tribal warfare, over which it had no control.

According to the Rift Valley Institute, slave raiding and abduction "effectively ceased" in 2002, although an "unknown number" of slaves remained in captivity. "Slave" is a racial epithet directed towards darker-skinned Sudanese.

History of slavery in the Sudan

Slavery in the region of the Sudan has a long history, beginning in the ancient Nubian and ancient Egyptian times and continuing up to the present.

Prisoners of war were a regular occurrence in the ancient Nile Valley and Africa. During times of conquest and after winning battles, Egyptians were taken as slaves by the ancient Nubians. In turn, the ancient Nubians took slaves after winning battles with the Libyans, Canaanites, and Egyptians.

Soon after the Arab conquest of Egypt, the Arabs attempted to conquer the kingdoms of Christian Nubia on multiple occasions, but utilizing strategic  warfare, the significantly smaller Christian Nubia defeated the larger Arab forces. Eventually, given their unsuccessful efforts, the Arabs signed the 600-year Baqt treaty with the Christian Nubian kingdom of Makuria. As a part of the treaty, the Nubians, already involved in the burgeoning East African slave trade, agreed to trade 360 slaves annually to their northern neighbors in exchange for spices and grains.

After the Nubian kingdoms' fall in 1504, the Muslims conquered most of Nubia, while the Funj conquered much of modern-day Sudan from Darfur to Khartoum; the Funj began to use slaves in the army in the reign of Badi III. Later, Egyptian slavers began raiding the area of southern Sudan. In particular, the ruler Muhammad Ali of Egypt attempted to build up an army of southern Sudanese slaves with the aid of the Nubian slavers. Attempts to ban slavery were later attempted by British colonial authorities in 1899, after their victory in the Mahdi War.

According to British explorer and abolitionist Samuel Baker, who visited Khartoum in 1862, six decades after the British authorities had declared the slave trade illegal, slavery was the industry "that kept Khartoum going as a bustling town". Baker described the practice of slave raiding of villages to the south by Sudanese slavers from Khartoum: An armed group would sail up the Nile, find a convenient African village, surround it during night and attack just before dawn, burning huts and shooting. Women and young adults would be captured and bound with "forked poles on their shoulders", hand tied to the pole in front, children bound to their mothers. To render "the village so poor that surviving inhabitants would be forced to collaborate with slavers on their next excursion against neighboring villages," the village would be looted of cattle, grain, ivory, with everything else destroyed.

Modern-day slavery 
The "modern wave" of slavery in Sudan reportedly began in 1983 with the Second Sudanese Civil War between the North and South. It involved large numbers of Sudanese people from the southern and central regions, "primarily the Dinka, Nuer and Nuba of central Sudan," being captured and sold "(or exploited in other ways)" by Northern Sudanese who consider themselves as Arabs. The problem of slavery reportedly became worse after the National Islamic Front-backed military government took power in 1989, the Khartoum government declared jihad against non-Muslim opposition in the south. The Baggara were also given freedom "to kill these groups, loot their wealth, capture slaves, expel the rest from the territories, and forcefully settle their lands."

The Sudan Criminal Code of 1991 did not list slavery as a crime, but the Republic of Sudan has ratified the Slavery Convention, the Supplementary Convention on the Abolition of Slavery, the Slave Trade, and Institutions and Practices Similar to Slavery, and is a party to the International Covenant on Civil and Political Rights (ICCPR). Nonetheless, according to the imam of the Ansar movement and former prime minister, Sadiq al-Mahdi, jihad
requires initiating hostilities for religious purposes. [...] It is true that the [NIF] regime has not enacted a law to realize slavery in Sudan. But the traditional concept of jihad does allow slavery as a by-product [of jihad].

Human Rights Watch and Amnesty International first reported on slavery in Sudan in 1995 in the context of the Second Sudanese Civil War. In 1996, two more reports emerged, one by a United Nations representative and another by reporters from the Baltimore Sun, just one of many "extensive accounts of slave raiding" in Sudan provided by Western media outlets since 1995.

Human Rights Watch and others have described the contemporary form of slavery in Sudan as mainly the work of the armed, government-backed militia of the Baggara tribes who raid civilians—primarily of the Dinka ethnic group from the southern region of Bahr El Ghazal. The Baggara captured children and women who were taken to western Sudan and elsewhere. They were "forced to work for free in homes and in fields, punished when they refuse, and abused physically and sometimes sexually".  The government of Sudan "arm[ed] and sanction[ed] the practice of slavery by this tribal militia", known as muraheleen, as a low cost way of weakening its enemy in the Second Sudanese Civil War, the rebel Sudan People's Liberation Movement/Army (SPLM/A),  which was thought to have a base of support among the Dinka tribe of southern Sudan.

According to a 2002 report issued by the International Eminent Persons Group, (acting with the encouragement of the US State Department) both the government-backed militias and the rebels (led by the SPLA) have been found guilty of abducting civilians, but "of particular concern" were incidents that occurred "in conjunction with attacks by pro-government militias known as murahaleen on villages in SPLA-controlled areas near the boundary between northern and southern Sudan."  The Group concluded that "in a significant number of cases", abduction is the first stage in "a pattern of abuse that falls under the definition of slavery in the International Slavery Convention of 1926 and the Supplementary Convention of 1956."

Estimates of abductions during the war range from 14,000 to 200,000.  One estimate by social historian Jok Madut Jok is of 10–15,000 slaves in Sudan "at any one time", the number remaining roughly constant as individual slaves come and go—as captives escape, have their freedom bought or are released as unfit for labor, more are captured. Until 1999, the number of slaves kept by slave taker retains after the distribution of the human war booty was usually "three to six and rarely exceeded ten per slave raider". Although modern slave trading never approached the scale of nineteenth-century Nilotic slavery, some Baggara "operated as brokers to convert the war captives into slaves", selling slaves "at scattered points throughout Western Sudan", and "as far north as Kharoum". Illegal and highly unpopular internationally, the trade is done "discreetly", and kept to a "minimal level" so that "evidence for it is very difficult to obtain." "Slave owners simply deny that Southern children working for them are slaves." 

According to a January 25, 1999, report in CBS news, slaves have been sold for $50 apiece.

Writing for The Wall Street Journal on December 12, 2001, Michael Rubin said:

The Sudanese government has never admitted to the existence of "slavery" within their borders, but in 1999, under international pressure, it established the committee to Eradicate the Abduction of Women and Children (CEAWC). 4,000 "abducted" southerners were returned to South Sudan through this program before it was shut down in 2010.

End of trade

According to the Rift Valley Institute, slave-raiding, "abduction … effectively ceased" in 2002.  "A significant number" of slaves were repatriated after 2005 the Comprehensive Peace Agreement of 2005, but "an unknown number" remain in captivity.  The Institute created a "Sudan Abductee Database" containing "the names of over 11,000 people who were abducted in 20 years of slave-raiding" in Northern Bahr el-Ghazal state in southern Sudan, from 1983 to 2002.  The January 2005 "North/South Comprehensive Peace Agreement (CPA)" peace treaty that ended the Sudanese civil war put an end to the slave raids, according to Christian Solidarity International, but did not provide a "way home for those already enslaved."  The last Human Rights Watch "Backgrounder on Slavery in Sudan" was updated March 2002.

Christian Solidarity International slave redemption efforts
Efforts to "redeem" or to buy the freedom of slaves in Sudan are controversial.
Beginning in 1995, Christian Solidarity International began "redeeming" slaves through an underground network of traders set up through local peace agreements between Arab and southern chiefs. The group claims to have freed over 80,000 people in this manner since that time. Several other charities eventually followed suit.

In 1999, UNICEF called the practice of redeeming slaves 'intolerable', arguing that these charities are implicitly accepting that human beings can be bought and sold.

UNICEF also said that buying slaves from slave-traders gives them cash to purchase arms and ammunition. But Christian Solidarity said they purchase slaves in Sudanese pounds, not US dollars that could be used to purchase arms.

As of 2015, Christian Solidarity International stated that it continues redeeming slaves. On its website, the group stated that it employs safeguards against fraud, and that allegations of fraud "remain today unsubstantiated".

Legacy 

Racial abuse is commonplace in Sudan where Skin whitening is relatively common. In 2020, Al-Intibaha newspaper called the female foorball coach a slave. During Black Lives Matter potest in 2020, a number of Sudanese social media users racially abused a well-known black Sudanese footballer Issam Abdulraheem and a fair-skinned Arab make-up artist Reem Khougli, following their marriage. Golrification of past Slave traders is common in Sudan. al-Zubair Pasha Rahma, a slave trader, has a street named after him in the capital.

See also

 Slavery in modern Africa
 Mende Nazer
 Francis Bok
 Human rights in Sudan
 History of Slavery in the Muslim World
 Christian Solidarity International

Notes

References

Further reading

External links
 Civil Rights Leaders Criticized for Silence on Sudan Slavery

Sudan
Society of Sudan
History of Sudan
Anti-black racism in Africa
Human rights abuses in Sudan